När Lighthouse is a Swedish lighthouse located outside the village När on the southeast side of the island Gotland. It was constructed in 1872, the sketchings were made by architect John Höjer. It is located in a nature reserve and birding area. It is a listed building in Sweden.

The light originally carried a kerosene lamp and it was updated with electric power in 1961. It was also automated that same year, and the rotating lens was replaced by a modern one. It is owned by the Swedish Maritime Administration.

Gallery

See also

 List of lighthouses and lightvessels in Sweden

References

External links

 Sjofartsverket  
 The Swedish Lighthouse Society

Lighthouses completed in 1872
Lighthouses in Sweden
Gotland